That Was Life is a 2020 Spanish drama film directed and written by David Martín de los Santos. It stars Petra Martínez and Anna Castillo as two Spanish immigrants who form a friendship after meeting in a hospital in Belgium.

Plot
María and Verónica, two Spanish immigrants of different generations, meet in a hospital in Belgium where they form a friendship after an unexpected event, this leads María to embark on a journey of self discovery through the Spain she left many decades ago.

Cast

Production
The film began shooting in May 2019 in different locations of Spain in Almeria and Cabo de Gata, later in Ghent, Belgium. Santiago Racaj was the cinematographer and Javier Chavarría was the production designer, other credits include Tonucha Vidal (casting director), Eva Valiño (sound) and Miguel Doblado (editing).

Release
The film was screened at the 17th Seville European Film Festival (SEFF), where it won the ASECAN award for Best Film and Best Actress for Petra Martínez. The film had to postpone its release in cinemas several times due to the COVID-19 pandemic, ultimately being scheduled to be released on December 10, 2021.

Critical reception
The performance of Martínez was met with acclaim, Demetrios Matheou from Screen International wrote that "Martinez, well into her seventies when she shot this, gives a strong, minimalist performance". Writing for Cineuropa, Alfonso Rivera commented that "David Martín de los Santos makes his debut in fiction with a humble, emotional and intimate film, that supports its subtle theme over the experienced performance of the great Petra Martínez".

Accolades 

|-
| align = "center" rowspan = "5" | 2021 || 27th Forqué Awards || Best Actress (film) || Petra Martínez ||  || 
|-
| rowspan = "4" | 34th ASECAN Awards || colspan = "2" | Best Film ||  || rowspan = "4" | 
|-
| Best Director || David Martín de los Santos || 
|-
| Best Screenplay || David Martín de los Santos || 
|-
| Best Actress || Petra Martínez || 
|-
| align = "center" rowspan = "16" | 2022 || rowspan = "2" | 9th Feroz Awards || Best Actress (film) || Petra Martínez ||  || rowspan = "2" | 
|-
| Best Supporting Actress (film) || Anna Castillo ||  
|-
| rowspan = "8" | 1st Carmen Awards || Best Fiction Feature Film || La vida era eso AIE ||  || rowspan = "8" | 
|-
| Best Screenplay || David Martín de los Santos || 
|-
| Best Production Supervision || Damián Paris || 
|-
| Best Actress || Petra Martínez || 
|-
| Best Original Song || Estrella Morente & Fernando Vacas || 
|-
| Best New Director || David Martín de los Santos || 
|-
| Best Editing || Miguel Doblado || 
|-
| Best Supporting Actress || Pilar Gómez || 
|-	
| rowspan = "2" | 77th CEC Medals || Best New Director || David Martín de los Santos ||  || rowspan = "2" | 
|-
| Best Actress || Petra Martínez || 
|-
| rowspan = "2" | 36th Goya Awards || Best Actress || Petra Martínez ||  || rowspan = "2" | 
|-
| Best New Director || David Martín de los Santos || 
|-
|-
| rowspan = "2" | 30th Actors and Actresses Union Awards || Best Film Actress in a Leading Role || Petra Martínez ||  || rowspan = "2" | 
|-
| Best Film Actress in a Secondary Role || Anna Castillo || 
|}

See also 
 List of Spanish films of 2021

References

External links
 
 That Was Life at ICAA's Catálogo de Cinespañol

Spanish drama films
2020 films
Films about immigration to Europe
Films set in Belgium
Films shot in the province of Almería
Films shot in Belgium
2020s Spanish-language films
2020s Spanish films
2020 directorial debut films